Lectionary 1683, designated by ℓ 1683 in the Gregory-Aland numbering, is a Greek manuscript of the New Testament, on parchment leaves, dated paleographically to the 13th century.

Description 

It is written in Greek minuscule letters, on 241 parchment leaves (29.5 by 22 cm), 2 columns per page, 26 lines per page. The codex contains some Lessons from the four Gospels lectionary (Evangelistarium) with some lacunae. It has breathings and accents.

The codex now is located in the Bible Museum Münster (MS. 15).

See also 

 List of New Testament lectionaries
 Biblical manuscripts
 Textual criticism
 Bible Museum Münster

References

Further reading 

 S. P. Lambros, Νέος Ἑλληνομνήμων 12 (1915), p. 358.

External links 

 Lectionary 1683 at the CSNTM 
 Manuscripts of the Bible Museum 

Greek New Testament lectionaries
13th-century biblical manuscripts